This article describes about the squads for the 2014 Copa América Femenina.

Group A

Colombia
The squad was announced on 8 September 2014.

Head coach: Fabián Taborda

Ecuador
Head coach: Vanessa Arauz

Peru
The squad was announced on 10 September 2014.

Head coach: Marta Tejedor

Uruguay
The squad was announced on 9 September 2014.

Head coach: Fabiana Manzolillo

Venezuela
The squad was announced on 10 September 2014.

Head coach: Kenneth Zseremeta

Group B

Argentina
The squad was announced on 8 September 2014.

Head coach: Luis Nicosia

Bolivia
Head coach: Marco Sandy

Brazil
The squad was announced on 7 August 2014.

Head coach: Vadão

Chile
The squad was announced on 21 August 2014.

Head coach: Ronnie Radonich

Paraguay
The squad was announced on 9 September 2014.

Head coach: Julio Gómez

References

External links
Rosters

2014